Joseph Wright Taylor (1810 – 1880) is best known for being the financial catalyst for the founding of Bryn Mawr College. He was a graduate of the University of Pennsylvania, a physician and a member of the Society of Friends (popularly known as Quakers), and originally wanted the college to promote the ideals of the Quaker religion and the advancement of women's education. In 1878 he paid $53,500 for forty acres in Bryn Mawr, Pennsylvania.

In 1879, Taylor had begun to give physical shape to his idea for a women's college. He was involved in the planning of the practical and conceptual aspects of the new institution, including the selection of a site, an architect, and a landscape designer. Among the practical considerations for the final site selection were the location's healthfulness and proximity to the railroad, Haverford College, and Philadelphia. The original campus, a small segment of the Thomas-Humphries Tract and part of a larger property deeded by William Penn to Edward Pritchard and Co. in 1682, comprised thirty-two acres between Merion, Roberts, Gulph and Yarrow roads.

By 1893, the Board of Directors had expanded from the Quaker focus to make the college non-denominational.

References

1810 births
1880 deaths
Educators from Pennsylvania
Bryn Mawr College
19th-century Quakers
American Quakers
Patrons of schools
Physicians from Pennsylvania
University and college founders
19th-century American educators
19th-century philanthropists